Colmenar Viejo is a town and municipality of about 48,614 inhabitants, located in the Community of Madrid, Spain, 30 kilometers north of Madrid on the M-607 motorway. It belongs to the comarca of Cuenca Alta del Manzanares.

Main sights
In the town, there are many archeological sites, most of them come from hispanic- visigothic times, with household areas and burials.

The most important tourist attractions places in Colmenar Viejo are:
 Basilica de Nuestra Señora de la Asunción
 Ermita de Remedios, saint of the town
 Visigothic archaeological tombs

Physical environment

Colmenar Viejo's municipality has a size of 182.6 square kilometres (70.5 square miles), the third largest in the province of Madrid, after Madrid and Aranjuez.

Traditional granite mining has been changing Colmenar Viejo's landscape. As a result of livestock farming, mainly cow and horse cattle, grassland has been taking a main role.

A large part of land under Colmenar Viejo's jurisdiction is inside of the Parque regional de la Cuenca Alta del Manzanares (Manzanares Upper Basin Regional Park), causing that land to be under a high protection environmental level.
The Navalvillar Grassland is protected by the municipality and, albeit it does not belong to the Park, it is quite rich in flora and fauna.

Climate
Colmenar Viejo has a hot-summer Mediterranean climate (Köppen Csa) with cold winters.

Demography

Cinematography
Estudios Tablada in Madrid used the Dehesa de Navalvillar as a filming location for films such as El Cid, Spartacus, Alexander the Great, For A Few Dollars More, La última aventura, The Good, The Bad and The Ugly and Conan the Barbarian. 

The television series Locked Up (Vis a vis) also commissioned a studio in Colmenar Viejo for most of its filming. Lately, the Netflix series Money Heist and Sky Rojo took several scenes filmed there.

Transport

Bus

Urban lines 
 L-1: Las Adelfillas - Train Station

 L-2: Remedios Avenue - Train Station

Interurban lines 
 610: Torrelodones - Hoyo de Manzanares - Colmenar Viejo
 SE 720: Colmenar Viejo - Manzanares el Real (by Soto del Real)
 720: Colmenar Viejo - Collado Villalba
 721: Colmenar Viejo (by Libertad Avenue) - Madrid (Plaza de Castilla)
 722: Colmenar Viejo (by Ronda Oeste) - Madrid (Plaza de Castilla)
 723: Colmenar Viejo - Tres Cantos (not available on Sundays)
 724: El Boalo - Manzanares el Real - Madrid (Plaza de Castilla)
 725: La Cabrera - Valdemanco - Bustarviejo - Miraflores de la Sierra - Madrid (Plaza de Castilla)
 726: Navalafuente - Guadalix de la Sierra - Madrid (Plaza de Castilla)
 727: San Agustín de Guadalix - Colmenar Viejo
 Night bus line 702: Colmenar Viejo - Madrid (Plaza de Castilla)

Train  
Colmenar Viejo has a train station in the outskirts of the town, which is the terminal of line C-4 of Cercanías Madrid. From the station, you can go to Tres Cantos in about 8 minutes, to Cantoblanco University in about 15 and to Madrid (Chamartin) in about 23. Since 2011, they used to pass trains to Burgos in Colmenar, but due to a detachment in the Somosierra tunnel, the trains to Burgos no longer pass through here.

Festivities

 Fiesta de la Vaquilla, February 2
 Fiesta de la Maya, May 2
 Festivities in honour of the Virgen of Remedios, last weekend of August
 Day of Colmenar Viejo, commemorating the villages endorsement by Ferdinand II of Aragon, November 22

Twin towns
 Colleferro, Italy
  Suresnes, France

References

External links

 Official website 
 Colmenar Viejo in the 1785 map of New Castile
 Colmenar Viejo bird eye

Municipalities in the Community of Madrid